Liga Femenina 2 is second division of the women's league of basketball in Spain. It was founded in 2001.

Competition format
Teams in this league are divided into two groups by geographical criteria. The top four teams of each one, qualify to the promotion playoffs. In these playoffs, the qualified teams are divided into two groups of four teams, where the two top teams qualify to the Finals. The two winners of the finals promote to Liga Femenina.

Until 2005, the promotion playoff consisted in best-of-three games series between the top four teams of each group.

History

External links
 Official Site 

Women's basketball leagues in Spain
Bal
Sports leagues established in 2001
Spain
 Professional sports leagues in Spain